The Men's 100 metre butterfly competition of the 2018 FINA World Swimming Championships (25 m) was held on 12 and 13 December 2018 at the Hangzhou Olympic Sports Center.

Records
Prior to the competition, the existing world and championship records were as follows.

Results

Heats
The heats were started at 10:33.

Semifinals
The semifinals were held at 20:22.

Semifinal 1

Semifinal 2

Final
The final was held at 20:00.

References

Men's 100 metre butterfly